Nebria daisetsuzana is a species of ground beetle in the Nebriinae subfamily that is endemic to Japan.

References

daisetsuzana
Beetles described in 1952
Beetles of Asia
Endemic fauna of Japan